Castles for Two is an American 1917 silent drama film directed by Frank Reicher and starring Marie Doro and Elliott Dexter. It is based on an original story for the screen, Rich Girl - Poor Girl, by Beatrice C. deMille and Leighton Osmun. A copy of the film is preserved at the Library of Congress.

Cast
 Marie Doro - Patricia Calhoun
 Elliott Dexter - Brian O'Neil
 Mayme Kelso - Patricia's Secretary
 Jane Wolff - Brian's Sister (*Jane Wolfe)
 Harriet Sorenson - Brian's Sister
 Lillian Leighton - Brian's Sister
 Julia Jackson - Brian's Mother
 Horace B. Carpenter - Neough
 Billy Elmer - Callahan
 Marie Mills - The Nanny

References

External links
 
 
still of Marie Doro & Elliot Dexter from the film

1917 films
1917 drama films
Silent American drama films
American silent feature films
American black-and-white films
Films based on short fiction
Paramount Pictures films
Films directed by Frank Reicher
1910s American films